Tello Namane (born 15 January 1974) is a Lesotho long-distance runner. He competed in the men's 5000 metres at the 1992 Summer Olympics.

References

1974 births
Living people
Athletes (track and field) at the 1992 Summer Olympics
Lesotho male long-distance runners
Olympic athletes of Lesotho
Place of birth missing (living people)